New Atlanta Communications, LLC is a software company specializing in products to ease creation of Web applications. Based in Alpharetta, Georgia, United States, and founded in 1998, the company markets 3 products: ServletExec, JTurbo, and BlueDragon.

External links
 New Atlanta
 Products

Software companies based in Georgia (U.S. state)
Companies based in Fulton County, Georgia
Software companies established in 1998
Software companies of the United States

1998 establishments in the United States
Companies established in 1998
1998 establishments in Georgia (U.S. state)